Neutral ceramidase is an enzyme that in humans is encoded by the ASAH2 gene.

References

External links

Further reading